Brady Sheldon (born February 23, 1993) is a professional gridiron football linebacker who is a currently a free agent. He was most recently a member of the Edmonton Elks of the Canadian Football League (CFL). He played college football at Ferris State.

Professional career

Oakland Raiders
Sheldon signed with the Oakland Raiders as an undrafted free agent on July 14, 2017. He was waived by the Raiders on September 2, 2017. He was re-signed to the practice squad on November 21, 2017. He was promoted to the active roster on December 22, 2017.

On June 12, 2018, Sheldon was waived by the Raiders.

Cleveland Browns
On June 13, 2018, Sheldon was claimed off waivers by the Cleveland Browns.

On September 1, 2018, Sheldon was waived by the Browns and was re-signed to the practice squad. He was released on October 30, 2018.

Green Bay Packers
On November 6, 2018, Sheldon was signed to the Green Bay Packers practice squad. He signed a reserve/future contract with the Packers on December 31, 2018.

On August 31, 2019, Sheldon was waived by the Packers and was signed to the practice squad the next day. He was released on October 1.

Cincinnati Bengals
On November 5, 2019, Sheldon was signed to the Cincinnati Bengals practice squad. He was promoted to the active roster on December 17, 2019. He was waived on September 3, 2020.

New York Jets
On December 8, 2020, Sheldon signed with the practice squad of the New York Jets. He was elevated to the active roster on December 26 and January 2, 2021, for the team's weeks 16 and 17 games against the Cleveland Browns and New England Patriots, and reverted to the practice squad after each game. His practice squad contract with the team expired after the season on January 11, 2021.

Toronto Argonauts
On November 9, 2021, it was announced that Sheldon had signed with the Toronto Argonauts. He played in one regular season game, on November 16, 2021, where he had three defensive tackles. He spent part of 2022 training camp with the team, but was released after the first pre-season game on May 29, 2022.

Edmonton Elks
On May 31, 2022, The Edmonton Elks signed Sheldon. He became a starter by Week 2 of the regular season. However, he was released on December 1, 2022.

References

External links
Toronto Argonauts bio
Ferris State Bulldogs bio

1993 births
Living people
People from Novi, Michigan
Players of American football from Michigan
American football linebackers
Ferris State Bulldogs football players
Oakland Raiders players
Cleveland Browns players
Green Bay Packers players
Cincinnati Bengals players
New York Jets players
Toronto Argonauts players